"Decline" is a song by British singer and songwriter Raye featuring Nigerian singer and songwriter Mr Eazi, released 3 November 2017, as the lead single from the formers third EP, Side Tape. The song samples and interpolates the 2002 single "Always on Time" by Ja Rule featuring Ashanti.

Raye promoted "Decline" through live performances at the events, as Capital's 2018 Summertime Ball, 2018 Wireless Festival, and also Rita Ora's The Girls Tour as the supporting act. Its official music video premiered on 20 November 2017 on singer's official VEVO channel.

"Decline" was a commercial success peaking at number 15 on the UK Singles (Official Charts Company) becoming Raye's highest entry as lead artist at the time and also appeared in the top 100 years end list in the UK. It has since been certified platinum by the United Kingdom (BPI)

Track listing
Digital download
"Decline" – 3:08

Digital download – Remix
"Decline" (Remix) (Raye and Ramz) – 3:16

Digital download – Acoustic
"Decline" (Acoustic) – 3:45

Charts

Year-end charts

Certifications

References

2017 singles
2017 songs
Polydor Records singles
Raye (singer) songs
Songs written by Raye (singer)
Songs written by Irv Gotti

Songs written by Jin Jin (musician)
Songs written by Fraser T. Smith
Songs written by Channel 7 (musician)
Songs written by Ja Rule